Michael Jai Feinberg is a photographer and software designer best known for creating the computer games Endorfun and Ishido. He is also the creator of lightSource Sacred Geometry software, and more recently Pypeline, a rich-media software platform.

References

Living people
American photographers
Year of birth missing (living people)